The Kandinsky–Clérambault syndrome or syndrome of the psychic automatism is a psychopathological syndrome, considered to be a typical feature of paranoid schizophrenia and is characterized by pseudohallucinations, delusions of control, telepathy, thought broadcasting and thought insertion by an external force. The syndrome also characterized by delusion of being controlled by a source outside himself.

History 
The syndrome of Kandinsky–Clérambault is named after Victor Kandinsky and Gaëtan Gatian de Clérambault.
Victor Kandinsky (1849–1889), a Russian psychiatrist, was the first to describe the syndrome of psychic automatism by his own subjective personal experiences during his psychotic episode. The syndrome of psychic automatism is described in a Kandinsky's monograph in Russian "On Pseudohallucinations" published posthumously in 1890 by his wife Elizaveta Freimut. The syndrome is also identified by Gaëtan Gatian de Clérambault (1872–1934), a French psychiatrist who credited with introducing the term "psychic automatism".

The Kandinsky-Clérambault syndrome is not well known and it is used mainly by Russian, French and German psychiatrists.

References

External links 
 Kandinsky-Clérambault Syndrome: Narration and Psychosis
 The Misidentification of Clérambault's and Kandinsky–Clérambault's Syndromes

Psychopathological syndromes
Schizophrenia